Sports Development Authority of Tamil Nadu Tennis Stadium, commonly known as SDAT Stadium, sometimes also called Nungambakkam Tennis Stadium, is located in Nungambakkam, Chennai, Tamil Nadu, India, and played host for the Chennai Open ATP Tennis championships held in the first week of January from 1996 to 2017. The stadium was built in 1995 by the Government of Tamil Nadu on the occasion of South Asian Federation Games held in Chennai that year. The stadium has been the venue for Indian Open tennis tournament annually since 1997. The stadium witnessed some dramatic scenes in 1998 when legends like Boris Becker and Patrick Rafter took part in the then named Goldflake Open. Rafter went on to win the tournament.

The stadium also witnessed the birth of the celebrated Indian doubles pair of Leander Paes and Mahesh Bhupathi who won the first three editions of the Goldflake Open. The complex has five hard courts including the floodlit centre court which has a seating capacity of about 5,800.

The third round Davis Cup tie in Asia/Oceania Group I between India and Australia took place at the SDAT Tennis Stadium in May 2009.

The stadium again hosted a Davis Cup tie from 17 to 19 September 2010. The India Davis Cup team defeated the Brazil Davis Cup team in the 2010 Davis Cup World Group Play-offs to advance to  the 2011 Davis Cup World Group.

Renovation
In October 2013, the Tamil Nadu government ordered renovation of the stadium at a cost of  45 million.

See also

 List of tennis stadiums by capacity

References

External links
Chennai Open website
Davis Cup Group I Asia/Oceania 2009, 3rd Round

Tennis venues in India
Sports venues in Chennai
1995 establishments in Tamil Nadu
Sports venues completed in 1995
20th-century architecture in India